Robert George Zick (April 26, 1927 – June 12, 2017) was a professional baseball pitcher. He was born in Chicago, Illinois. He appeared in eight games in Major League Baseball for the Chicago Cubs in 1954. He batted left-handed and threw right-handed playing baseball.

Career 
Zick attended Fenger Academy High School in Chicago. He was signed by the Philadelphia Athletics as an amateur free agent on January 1, 1949. On December 3, 1951, Zick was selected by Cubs from the Athletics in the minor league draft. Zick made his major league debut on May 2, 1954, with the Chicago Cubs at age 27. He pitched 8 games, all as a relief pitcher, pitching 16.1 innings. He played his final game on September 6, 1954. He died June 12, 2017.

References

External links 

Bob Zick at Baseball Almanac

1927 births
2017 deaths
Major League Baseball pitchers
Chicago Cubs players
Tarboro A's players
Salisbury A's players
Los Angeles Angels (minor league) players
Des Moines Bruins players
Beaumont Exporters players
Baseball players from Chicago